Xiao Rong (born 24 August 1993) is a Chinese wheelchair fencer. She won the bronze medal in the women's sabre B event at the 2020 Summer Paralympics held in Tokyo, Japan.

References 

Living people
1993 births
Place of birth missing (living people)
Chinese female fencers
Wheelchair fencers at the 2020 Summer Paralympics
Medalists at the 2020 Summer Paralympics
Paralympic bronze medalists for China
Paralympic medalists in wheelchair fencing
Paralympic wheelchair fencers of China
21st-century Chinese women